Abhisheka means "bathing of the divinity to whom worship is offered." It is a religious rite or method of prayer in which a devotee pours a liquid offering on an image or murti of a deity. Abhisheka is common to Indian religions such as Hinduism, Buddhism and Jainism.

Hinduism
An abhiṣeka is conducted by priests by bathing the image of the deity being worshipped, amidst the chanting of mantras. Usually, offerings such as milk, yogurt, ghee, honey, panchamrita, sesame oil, rose water, sandalwood paste may be poured among other offerings depending on the type of abhishekam being performed. This rite is routinely performed in Hindu temples. A Rudrābhiṣeka or abhiṣeka of Rudra is performed on lingams. A Kumbhabhishekam is a consecration ritual for a Hindu temple.

Buddhism

Vajrayana Buddhism

In Vajrayana Buddhism or Mantrayana Buddhism, one enters into the path of Vajrayana Buddhism by receiving the four stages of tantric empowerments, or abhisheka: the vase abhisheka, secret abhisheka, prajnajnana abhisheka, and word abhisheka.

In Vajrayana Buddhism, an abhiṣeka can be a method for performing pointing-out instructions, a way to offer blessings of a lineage to participants, or it can be an empowerment to begin a particular meditation practice.

This empowerment ritual is present in Tibetan Buddhism as well as in Chinese Esoteric Buddhism and in Shingon Buddhism.

The abhiṣeka was originally used as a consecration rite. Water from the four oceans was poured out of golden jars onto the head of royalty. It was used during a monarch's accession ceremony and also his investiture ceremony.

Tantric Buddhism
The abhiseka rite (wangkur) is a prelude for initiation into mystical teaching. There are four classes of abhiseka, each being associated with one of the four Tantras. They are master consecration, secret consecration, knowledge of prajna, and the fourth consecration.

Shingon Buddhism
The  in Shingon Buddhism is the initiation rite used to confirm that a student of esoteric Buddhism has now graduated to a higher level of practice. The kanji used literally mean "pouring from the peak", which poetically describes the process of passing on the master's teachings to the student. The rite was popular in China during the Tang dynasty, and Kūkai, founder of Shingon, studied there extensively before introducing this rite to the Japanese Buddhist establishment of the time. This rite is generally only offered at Mount Kōya in Wakayama Prefecture in Japan, but it can be offered under qualified masters and under proper auspices outside Japan, albeit very rarely.

The Shingon rite utilizes one of the two Mandala of the Two Realms, depending on the occasion. In esoteric ritual, after the student receives the samaya precepts, the teacher of the esoteric Buddhism assumes the role of the teacher, usually Mahavairocana Buddha, while the master and student repeat specific mantras in a form of dialogue taken from esoteric Buddhist sutras. The student, who is blindfolded, then throws a flower upon the Mandala that is constructed, and where it lands (i.e. which deity) helps dictate where the student should focus his devotion on the esoteric path. From there, the student's blindfold is removed and a vajra is placed in hand.

Jainism

Abhisheka in Jainism means the ritual of consecration of the image of Jina.

Cultural examples
In the Mahavairocana Sutra, Mahavairocana Buddha reveals the Mandala of the Womb Realm to Vajrasattva and teaches the rites that relate to the Womb Mandala which are known as, and an example of, abhiṣeka.
In Hinduism, the god Rama performed abhiṣheka after installing a jyotirlinga in Rameswaram which is now the Ramanathaswamy Temple.

See also

 Awgatha
 Buddhābhiṣeka
 Diksha
 Puja (Buddhism)
 Puja (Hinduism)
 Puja (Jainism)
 Rājyābhiṣeka
 Abhi (Sanskrit preposition, and element of the word "Abhisheka")

References

Citations

Sources

Further reading

Abe, Ryuichi (1999). "The Weaving of Mantra: Kukai and the Construction of Esoteric Buddhist Discourse". Columbia University Press. 
Ferm, Virgilius (1945). An Encyclopedia of Religion. New York: Philosophical Library, 1945. 
Hakeda, Yoshito S. (1972). Kūkai and His Major Works. Columbia University Press. 
Hayward, Jeremy (2008) Warrior-King of Shambhala: Remembering Chögyam Trungpa. Boston: Wisdom. 

Buddhist rituals
Puja (Hinduism)
Jain practices
Sanskrit words and phrases